Paramun Buttress (‘Paramunski Rid’ \pa-ra-'mun-ski 'rid\) is the ice-covered buttress rising to 1638 m on the southeast side of Detroit Plateau on Nordenskjöld Coast in Graham Land, Antarctica, and situated between tributaries to Edgeworth Glacier.  It has steep and partly ice-free west, south and east slopes.

The peak is named after the settlement of Paramun in Western Bulgaria.

Location

Maps
 Antarctic Digital Database (ADD). Scale 1:250000 topographic map of Antarctica. Scientific Committee on Antarctic Research (SCAR). Since 1993, regularly upgraded and updated.

Notes

References
 Paramun Buttress. SCAR Composite Antarctic Gazetteer.
 Bulgarian Antarctic Gazetteer. Antarctic Place-names Commission. (details in Bulgarian, basic data in English)

External links
 Paramun Buttress. Copernix satellite image

Mountains of Graham Land
Bulgaria and the Antarctic
Nordenskjöld Coast